Rosie Goldsmith is a journalist specializing in arts and current affairs in the UK and abroad. 

In 20 years at the BBC, she travelled and presented the BBC programmes Front Row and Crossing Continents. She is multi lingual and runs events and festivals and with cultural organizations. She is director of the European Literature Network and founder of The Riveter magazine of European literature in English.

Early life and education 
Goldsmith was born in Newquay, Cornwall, to Jean and Chris, who were both teachers. Chris was also a talented musician and painter. The oldest of four children, when Goldsmith was six weeks old she moved with her parents to southern Africa, where she spent her early life in Rhodesia/Zimbabwe and South Africa, and where her brother Raymond and sister Hilary were born. Catherine was born on their return to Cornwall. When Goldsmith was ten the whole family moved to New York, USA, where her father taught art.

Goldsmith read French and German at Nottingham University (UK).

Career

BBC 
After graduating, Goldsmith moved to Germany for further study and to work as a freelance reporter for the BBC, Deutschlandfunk and DeutscheWelle.

In 1989, Goldsmith returned to the UK, to London, to join the BBC (her first job), and was working on the launch team of BBC Radio 4's Eurofile, the UK's first weekly programme about Europe, just as the Berlin Wall fell.

Working full-time at the BBC until 2009, Goldsmith became a senior presenter, reporter and critic on a variety of arts and current affairs programmes. She presented BBC Radio 4's live on-air arts programmes Front Row and Open Book, its foreign affairs strand Crossing Continents and the global media show A World in Your Ear. She regularly worked as a presenter, reporter and critic on programmes such as Profile, From Our Own Correspondent, Pick of the Week, Saturday Review and Woman’s Hour, as well as a range of documentary series.

In her twenty years on the staff, Goldsmith also produced and edited a range of high-profile BBC radio programmes, including Asia File, Crossing Continents, From Our Own Correspondent, The My Lai Tapes, Diverging Dominions; major BBC anniversary events, and programmes featuring (among others) Clive James, David Mamet, Misha Glenny, Nick Clarke, James Naughtie and Alastair Cooke.

Independent journalism 
Since 2009, Goldsmith has worked as an independent journalist. She continues to present and contribute to BBC radio and has written reviews, columns and articles for major publications including the Guardian, Telegraph, Financial Times, Independent, New Statesman and others.

Goldsmith has also created and presented a wide variety of online audio and video shows, including the 10x10 Commonwealth Writers podcasts, the Goethe-Institut's Doppelgaenger programmes and the British Council’s international current affairs show The Exchange. She created the online and print magazine The Riveter which profiles international literature in translation.

Goldsmith presented the monthly literary podcast ‘The Words’, produced by Simon and Schuster, which ran from 2018 and was selected as a Guardian Podcast of the Week, Grazia Podcast favourite and featured on the ITunes frontpage.

She created the online and print magazine The Riveter which profiles European literature in translation, and presents the accompanying audio and video Riveting Interviews of authors and translators. She launched Riveting Reviews in 2015 to expand the critical coverage of translated literature in the UK.

Events chairing and curating 
In 2009 she was curator and chair for Berlin & Beyond, Southbank Centre London's marking of the 20th anniversary of the fall of the Berlin Wall, and from 2008-2012 she was multi-media journalist in residence for Southbank Centre's London Literature Festival. She is currently a regular chair for, amongst others, the Hay Festival, Wales, Cheltenham, Birmingham, and for several international festivals, including the Emirates Literature Festival, Dubai (up to 2019), the ELit Literature Days, Austria, and in Norway for the SILK International Arts and Literature Festival, and the Future Library project. She also chairs events for the British Library, British Council, London Book Fair, National Writers Centre in Norwich and Frankfurt Book Fair.

Goldsmith created Fashion and Fiction, which she hosted at the Victoria and Albert Museum, High Impact: Literature From the Low Countries (UK-wide), and Greece Is The Word at the Southbank Centre, London. From 2009-2016 Goldsmith was the host and chair of judges for European Literature Night, an annual event featuring prominent writers, at the British Library. She has developed literature and translation programmes for the Swiss Arts Council, Pro Helvetia (2018-2020) and the Romania Rocks festival for the Romanian Cultural Institute (2020).

European Literature Network 
In 2010 Goldsmith founded and became director of the European Literature Network, a free and independent organization that brings together writers, translators, publishers, booksellers and journalists working in European fiction and translation in the UK. ELNet was a recipient of Arts Council England grants from in 2015-2019 and Creative Europe funding up to 2018. 

ELNet has more than 800 registered members and thousands of followers all over the world. It runs an active website, reviews, blogs, videos, workshops, a magazine (The Riveter) and networking meetings. ELNet is today run by volunteers. As part of this work, she is frequently asked to participate in European cultural events. In 2017, Goldsmith was appointed Chair of the Judges for three years (2018-2020) of the EUR 20,000 EBRD International Literature Prize, which she helped launch.

Literature and language-learning 
Goldsmith speaks French, German and Italian. She has acted as the UK literature consultant for several organizations, including Pro Helvetia in Switzerland and Letterenfonds, the Dutch Literature Foundation. She is an active champion of modern language-learning and translation. From 2012-2013 she was on the Advisory Panel on Culture to the European Commission, and from 2010-2013 was chair of the Association of Language Learning Conferences. She was a member of the Creative Multilingualism Project (Oxford University), the All Party Parliamentary Group on Languages, and, Born Global/Speak To The Future. She has lectured on the importance of language learning at multiple institutions, including Oxford and Cambridge Universities, Chatham House, the British Academy, Europe House and the British Centre for Literary Translation.

Media training and Specialist PR services 
Through the media partnership, Sounds Right, Goldsmith runs media and presentation training workshops. Clients include the British Museum, the Victoria and Albert Museum, the Royal Academy of Arts, EUNIC, British Veterinary Association, Association of Ophthalmologists, Bishopsgate Institute, CreateLondon, Cultureshock Media, the Guardian, European Film Festival, Pushkin Press, Southbank Centre, the Polish Cultural Institute and the Goethe-Institut London.

Awards 

Goldsmith won Sony Awards (Radio Academy Awards) for her work on the BBC programmes The My Lai Tapes, Pushing Back the Curtain and Eurofile.

She won an Association for International Broadcasting award for Crossing Continents / African Perspectives in 2007.

Goldsmith won Audio & Music and Foreign Press Association awards for The My Lai tapes in 2008.

She has been short-listed and nominated for Sony, Amnesty, Foreign Press Association and One World Media awards for her broadcasting.
In 2013 she won the Chartered Institute of Linguists David Crystal Trophy for fostering the study of languages.

Personal life 
Goldsmith was born in Cornwall. She is married to fellow BBC broadcaster and journalist Max Easterman. They perform in their own jazz band.

References

Year of birth missing (living people)
Living people
British women journalists
English women journalists
BBC radio presenters
British women radio presenters